Chad Joseph Doreck (born November 19, 1978) is an American actor. He is the voice of Crackle for Rice Krispies, and was the voice of the supporting role of Brad on the Nickelodeon series, My Life as a Teenage Robot. In 2007, he was one of the final 12 contestants on Grease: You're the One That I Want!, a televised competition to choose the leads for the revival of Grease by Kathleen Marshall.

Early life and education
Doreck is the son of Stephan Doreck and Catherine Doreck, and has a brother and sister. A native of Southern California, Doreck first became interested in singing as part of a church congregation. His career began with the help of his aunt.

He took his first acting role at the age of six in the music video for Oingo Boingo's "Weird Science". Doreck graduated from the Orange County School of the Arts, majoring in musical theatre. He briefly attended the University of Southern California.

Career 
Doreck wrote and produced a CD, which was released in 2005. In 2007, he released a seven-song album called Awake and Sing. He has also modeled for Sketchers, Vogue Italia, and Nordstrom, and has been the narrator on various programs televised on E!.

He played Matthew in the award-winning off-Broadway musical Altar Boyz from September 3, 2007 to March 30, 2008.

Grease: You're the One That I Want!
In 2007, Doreck was one of the final 12 contestants on Grease: You're the One That I Want!, a televised competition to choose the leads for the revival of Grease by Kathleen Marshall. On duet night (February 18, 2007), Doreck performed alongside fellow competitor Allie Schulz. The two were both praised for their chemistry and for their high-energy performance; judge David Ian referred to their performance as "theatrical Viagra".

On February 25, 2007, he was in the bottom four along with Kevin. The judges chose to save Doreck, putting him in the final four male contestants competing for the lead role of Danny Zuko. On March 11, 2007, Doreck was eliminated from the competition. His performances included:

 "Hound Dog" by Elvis Presley
 "Signed Sealed Delivered" by Stevie Wonder
 "My Eyes Adored You" by Frankie Valli
 "Ain't No Mountain High Enough" by Marvin Gaye and Tammi Terrell
 "Don't Stop Me Now" by Queen

Filmography

Film

Television

Video games

References

External links
 
 Grease: You're the One That I Want! from NBC.com
 Chad Doreck

1978 births
Living people
American male film actors
American male musical theatre actors
American male television actors
American male video game actors
American male voice actors
Male actors from California
Participants in American reality television series
University of Southern California alumni
Orange County School of the Arts alumni
20th-century American male actors
21st-century American male actors